The Roger Williams was a streamlined, six car, lightweight, DMU passenger train, built by the Budd Company in 1956 for the New York, New Haven and Hartford Railroad. The train was based on Budd's successful RDC DMU cars. The end two cars were equipped with streamlined locomotive style cabs and noses, resembling those on the Fairbanks-Morse P-12-42 Diesel locomotives. The four intermediate cars lacked operating controls and cabs.

For operation into Grand Central Terminal, the cars were each equipped with third-rail shoes, and small traction motors, allowing them to operate into the terminal under electric power, with their engines shut down.

After a short period of time in high speed service, the train was split up, and the cars were used in service with the New Haven's other RDCs. They worked for the New Haven, Penn Central, and Amtrak, until the last cars were retired in the 1980s. In the 1970s, Amtrak used several ex-Roger Williams cars on the New Haven–Boston Bay State.

The two end cars, and one intermediate car, are preserved in operating condition, by a private owner, at the Hobo Railroad in Lincoln, New Hampshire.

See also
Baldwin RP-210, a lightweight train locomotive built for the New Haven's Dan'l Webster train.
Fairbanks-Morse P-12-42, a lightweight train locomotive built for the New Haven's John Quincy Adams train.
EMD LWT12, a lightweight train locomotive built for GM's Aerotrain, and the Chicago, Rock Island and Pacific Railroad's Talgo Jet Rocket train.

References

 
 

Passenger trains of the New York, New Haven and Hartford Railroad
North American streamliner trains
Budd multiple units
Diesel multiple units of the United States
Named passenger trains of the United States
Railway services introduced in 1956